Manuel Vicente Sosa Morales (born 28 October 1983) is a Venezuelan actor known for his roles in various telenovelas.

Biography
He was a former member of the musical group Calle Ciega before he left to participate in the telenovela Mi Gorda Bella.

In late 2012, he released his first single from his upcoming album titled Dame.

Personal life
Manuel Sosa is publicly known with the nickname "Coko". He has two children: "Danielito" (official name: Daniel Alejandro) born on 29 October 2007 from his relationship with super model Shannon de Lima (born on 6 January 1989) and Sofia, born on 8 October 2008 from his relationship with fellow actress Mirela Mendoza. In 2011 "Coko" had a brief relationship with co-star Sabrina Salvador while filming the telenovela Natalia del Mar.

Filmography

Telenovelas

Film
  Pasión de mil amores (2013)
  La hija de Juana Crespo (2006)

Animation
 Aji Picante

References

External links

Living people
1983 births
Venezuelan male telenovela actors